Pilea spruceana (silver tree) is a species of evergreen plant in the family Urticaceae, which grows up to 1 foot in height, with a spread of up to 1.5 feet.

Synonyms
 Adicea spruceana (Wedd.) Kuntze

References

 Prodr. 16(1): 161 1869.
 JSTOR
 National Gardening Association

spruceana